Conrad Louis Khan (born 2000) is an English actor. His performance in the film County Lines (2019) earned him nominations for Young British/Irish Performer at the London Critics Circle Film Awards, Most Promising Newcomer at the British Independent Film Awards, and the BAFTA Rising Star Award. He was also named a 2020 Screen International Star of Tomorrow.

On television, he appeared in the second series of Baptiste (2021) and played Duke Shelby in the sixth series of Peaky Blinders (2022).

Early life and education 
Khan was born in North London to a Pakistani father and German mother. He attended Fleet Primary School in Hampstead. He joined the Arcola Youth Theatre in Dalston. He is currently pursuing a Film Studies degree at Queen Mary, University of London.

Filmography

Film

Television

References

External links 

Living people
2000 births
21st-century English male actors
British male actors of South Asian descent
English male film actors
English people of Pakistani descent
English people of German descent
Male actors from London
People from Belsize Park
People from Hampstead
People from Kentish Town